Kelly Lynn Schmedes (born February 11, 1983) is an American soccer forward who last played for Boston Breakers of Women's Professional Soccer, and was a member of the United States women's national soccer team.

Playing career

Early life and university
Schmedes was born in Odessa, Texas. There she attended Permian High School. She was recruited by, and eventually enrolled in, the University of Texas at Austin. While there, Schmedes played for the Texas Longhorns women's soccer team. She was a four-time All-Big 12 First Team selection, in addition to being a three-time Hermann Trophy nominee and two-time NSCAA All-American. At the conclusion of her career with Texas, Schmedes was the all-time leader in points (129), assists (41), game-winning goals (13) and games started (84) for the university.

Professional club
After graduating from Texas, Schmedes played for W-League side Charlotte Lady Eagles in 2005. She appeared in 8 games (679 minutes) and scored 11 goals with an assist.

Her stay in the United States was short lived as Schmedes moved abroad to play for Sweden's KIF Örebro DFF in 2006.

2007 saw Schmedes return to Charlotte Lady Eagles, where she appeared in a further 12 games (903 minutes), and tallied 7 goals and 6 assists.  2008 saw more of the same with Schmedes playing in 13 games (1149 minutes). She scored 14 goals with 6 assists. Throughout her three years with the club, Schmedes ranks 3rd in goals and 4th in assists.

With the return of top-flight women's soccer in the United States in Women's Professional Soccer, teams were keen to obtain Schmedes' playing rights. She was selected in the 6th round of the 2009 WPS Draft by Boston Breakers. In the inaugural 2009 Women's Professional Soccer season, she appeared in 17 games (10 starts, 1033 total minutes) and scored 1 goal and 1 assist.

Following the conclusion of the 2009 season, Schmedes was drafted by expansion club Philadelphia Independence in the 2009 WPS Expansion Draft but did not make the final roster.

International
Schmedes is the all-time leader in international goals scored (31) for the United States U-20 women's national soccer team. As Kelly Wilson, she scored nine goals in five games at the 2002 FIFA U-19 Women's World Championship in Canada, becoming the second-highest scoring player in the tournament and winning the Bronze Ball and Silver Shoe awards.

Schmedes has only appeared twice for the United States national team, at the 2002 and 2005 Algarve Cups, scoring her only international goal against England in 2002.

International goals

References

External links

Texas Tech coaching profile
W-League player profile
Women's Professional Soccer player profile (oogle Cache)

1983 births
American expatriate women's soccer players
American women's soccer players
Boston Breakers players
Damallsvenskan players
Expatriate women's footballers in Sweden
KIF Örebro DFF players
Living people
People from Odessa, Texas
Philadelphia Independence players
Texas Longhorns women's soccer players
Women's association football forwards
United States women's international soccer players
Women's Professional Soccer players
Charlotte Lady Eagles players
USL W-League (1995–2015) players